John Plumptre may refer to:

 John Plumptre (elder) (1679–1751), MP for Nottingham
 John Plumptre (younger) (1711–1791), MP for Nottingham
 John Pemberton Plumptre (1791–1864), MP for East Kent
John Plumptre (priest) (1754 - 1825)